Lyndon Antoine (born 18 March 1986) is a Grenadian footballer who served as midfielder for the Grenada national football team. His last international game was on 12 July 2009  where he played for Grenada under Thomas Taylor against Honduras.

References

Living people
1986 births
Grenadian footballers
Grenada international footballers
2009 CONCACAF Gold Cup players
Association football midfielders
Place of birth missing (living people)
21st-century Grenadian people